De Huisman is a small octagonal mill at the Zaanse Schans in the Zaanstad, and currently makes mustard.

'De Huisman' has been located on the Zaanse Schans since 1955, next to the warehouse 'De Haan'. The mill was probably built in 1786 on the Blauwe Pad ("Blue Path", now "Claude Monet street") in Zaandam. The mill has functioned as a snuff mill (milling tobacco), a mustard mill, and a saw mill.

At the Zaanse Schans, the mill was converted again into a mustard mill, though it mills the mustard seeds in a modern, not wind-operated way. There are advanced plans for the mill to be restored to a traditional mustard mill, and to give the public the opportunity to visit the mill. The mill is owned by the Vereniging De Zaansche Molen.

See also 

 De Kat, Zaandam
 De Os, Zaandam
 De Zoeker, Zaandam
 De Gekroonde Poelenburg, Zaandam
 Het Jonge Schaap, Zaandam

External links 

 The website of the mill
 Vereniging de Zaansche Molen

Windmills in North Holland
Rijksmonuments in North Holland
Grinding mills in the Netherlands
Windmills completed in 1955
Zaandam
1955 establishments in the Netherlands
20th-century architecture in the Netherlands